The Tall Blond Man with One Black Shoe is a 1972 French spy comedy film directed by Yves Robert and written by Robert and Francis Veber, starring Pierre Richard, Bernard Blier, Jean Rochefort and Mireille Darc. Pierre Richard reprised his rôle of François Perrin in the sequel titled The Return of the Tall Blond Man with One Black Shoe, released in 1974, and La Chèvre, released in 1981.

The film was remade in English as The Man with One Red Shoe (1985), starring Tom Hanks and Dabney Coleman.

Plot
Bernard Milan, the second-in-command of France's Counter-Espionage department, is out to discredit his chief Louis Toulouse so that he can supplant him. When a French heroin smuggler who has been arrested in New York claims that the drug smuggling was a secret mission on the orders of French Counter-Espionage (actually on Milan's orders), the resulting bad press reflects on Toulouse, who cannot prove that Milan was responsible. In retaliation, Toulouse hatches a plot to deal with his ambitious subordinate: in a room which he knows is filled with hidden microphones, he sends his assistant Perrache to Orly airport at 9:30AM the next morning, making Milan (who has been listening) believe that Perrache has gone to meet a master spy who will expose Milan's treachery. However, Toulouse secretly instructs Perrache to choose someone at random from the crowd of travelers arriving at that time.

After considering several possibilities from the flight arriving at the specified time, Perrache selects François Perrin, an unsuspecting violinist, who is noticeable because, as the result of a practical joke played on him by his fellow orchestra members, he has arrived wearing a black shoe on one foot and a reddish-brown one on the other. Milan takes the bait and immediately begins a series of attempts to discover what Perrin knows—never realizing the fact that Perrin knows nothing at all about espionage (although he is an expert on music). Milan's machinations place Perrin in a series of increasingly peculiar adventures which he either avoids or escapes from by pure luck (which only confirm Milan's increasingly paranoid suspicions), and although Perrin is largely oblivious to the mayhem occurring around him, he cannot help noticing Milan's top agent, the beautiful femme fatale Christine. Adding to the confusion is the fact that Perrin is having an affair with Paulette Lefebvre, the wife of his best friend Maurice (both of whom are musicians in the same orchestra as Perrin), and Maurice, upon accidentally hearing a recording of Perrin and Paulette having torrid sex (made by Milan's agents and listened to inside a floral delivery truck), jumps to the mistaken conclusion that Paulette is having an affair with a florist. All the time, Toulouse and Perrache watch the chaos serenely, although Perrache is troubled by his chief's callousness toward the risk that Perrin might be killed.

Christine greets Perrin at her apartment's front door in a demure high-necked black-velvet dress, then turns around and shows that the dress is backless, displaying discreet buttock cleavage. A slapstick love scene (watched by Milan and his cohorts on a television monitor) ensues, concluding with Milan's decision (despite Christine's belief that Perrin could not possibly be an agent) to have Perrin eliminated. More mayhem (including Maurice's learning the truth about his wife's affair) and treachery (including Christine's defection from Milan's group to save Perrin, with whom she has fallen in love) follow, climaxing in the deaths of not only agents from both Toulouse's and Milan's groups but also Milan himself, who only learns the truth about Perrin from Perrache just before he dies. Realizing how he has been fooled, Milan dies with a smile of appreciation. Maurice, who has repeatedly walked in on the aftermaths of the shoot-outs in Perrin's apartment, suffers a total mental breakdown.

The film ends as it began, at Orly airport. Perrin pushes a huge Louis Vuitton steamer trunk in an airport luggage cart, talking softly to Christine, who is hidden inside. Their destination is Rio de Janeiro. Toulouse, who has been watching Perrin's departure on a monitor, instructs Perrache to contact Perrin when Perrin returns, remarking, "After all, he handles himself pretty well."

Awards
The film won the Silver Bear award at the 23rd Berlin International Film Festival in 1973. It was nominated for Best Foreign Language Film by the U.S. National Board of Review.

Cast
 Pierre Richard as François Perrin
 Bernard Blier as Bernard Milan
 Jean Rochefort as Colonel Louis Toulouse
 Mireille Darc as Christine
 Tania Balachova as Louis Toulouse's mother
 Jean Carmet as Maurice Lefebvre
 Colette Castel as Paulette Lefebvre
 Paul Le Person as Perrache
 Jean Obé as Botrel
 Robert Castel as Georghiu
 Jean Saudray as Poucet
 Roger Caccia as Mr. Boudart
 Arlette Balkis as Mrs. Boudart
 Robert Dalban as the false deliveryman
 Jean Bouise as the minister

Reception 
On Rotten Tomatoes, the film has an aggregate score of 67% based on 4 positive and 2 negative critic reviews.

References

External links
 
 
 
 Film photogallery 

1972 films
1972 comedy films
1970s comedy mystery films
1970s spy comedy films
Films about violins and violinists
Films directed by Yves Robert
Films scored by Vladimir Cosma
Films shot in Paris
Films set in Paris
French comedy mystery films
1970s French-language films
French spy comedy films
Gaumont Film Company films
1970s French films
Films with screenplays by Francis Veber